The 21st Century King James Version is an updated version of the King James Version Bible published in 1994 that stays true to the Textus Receptus, and does not delete Bible passages based on  Alexandrian Greek manuscripts. However, in contrast to the New King James Version, it does not alter the language significantly from the 1611 King James Version, retaining Jacobean grammar (including "thee" and "thou"), but it does attempt to replace some of the vocabulary that might no longer make sense to a modern reader. 

The reader should notice almost no difference from reading the King James Version except that certain archaic words have been replaced with words that are more understandable. The translation is directed towards readers who are looking for a very conservative King James update, but reduce the use of obsolete words.

A version containing the Apocrypha and without the unusual formatting was released under the name Third Millennium Bible in 1998.

Background
The 21st Century King James Version Bible is an updated version of the King James Version. It is not generally considered to be a new translation.

Alterations
Unlike the New King James Version, the 21st Century King James Version does not alter the language significantly from the King James Version. The author has eliminated "obsolete words." The changes in words are based on the second edition of the Webster's New International Dictionary. There were no changes related to gender or theology. Recently, it has the capitalization of pronouns much like New King James Version, addressing Deity while maintaining the archaic pronouns.

Examples comparing the old to the new:

The 21st Century King James Version is also known for its formatting. Passages considered "more familiar" are in bold print, while "less familiar" passages are placed in a sans-serif print. Passages from the Revised Common Lectionary are marked with diamonds, and the translations of names are sometimes included with brackets.

The 21st Century King James Version has also been released in an edition with the Apocrypha and without the unusual formatting; this is known as the Third Millennium Bible.

References

External links
 www.kj21.com - The official site for the 21st Century King James Version of the Bible
 KJ21 on BibleGateway.com - The complete text of the 21st Century King James Version, plus version, copyright and publisher information

1994 books
Bible translations into English
1994 in Christianity